Farnaz Abdoli is an Iranian fashion designer. She founded her own brand POOSH-e MA, in 2011. She designs outfits for womenswear, in particular for the women of Iran. She considers herself to be “daring... and I encourage women to also be avant-garde in the way they dress.”

Abdoli uses bright colours and Western-influenced patterns and cuts while staying within the dress code of Iran’s Islamic ideals. Her daring, artistic designs and tailored pieces have landed her in conflict between the Iranian government and her brand. Abdoli’s agenda for her brand is to challenge the government, but more importantly, to allow Iranian women to express themselves through fashion.

Early life and education 
Farnaz Abdoli grew up in Shiraz, Iran, with her family. Abdoli’s future career grew from designing clothes for herself and her sister, which her mother would then sew. Abdoli is grateful to her mother for allowing her to be passionate about the fashion industry. Abdoli is fluent in both Persian and English.

Abdoli's education began at The Art Institute of Shiraz (2007 to 2009), where she received her associates degree in graphic design. She then attended Sariyan University in Sari, Iran. After 2 years of study (2009 to 2011), she received a bachelor's degree in graphic design. During her four years of education, Abdoli also worked as a freelance graphic designer. Abdoli began to study fashion in 2014 at Istituto Europeo di Design, Barcelona (IED Barcelona) where she studied a short course in fashion/apparel design. Abdoli received her Master of Business Administration (MBA) in Shahid Beheshti University from 2014 to 2015.

She has described her love for fashion as originating when she was a young girl living in Iran; "As a young girl I wasn't able to find my desired streetwear". This was due to the effects of the Iranian Revolution, which had ushered in an Islamic government and introduced sanctions on women and subjected them to wearing Hijabs and other loose-fitting and modest clothing. This law was established by Mahmoud Ahmadinejad, who was the leader of the Basij Militia, which enforced this dress code across Iran, and women who resisted following the legally-required dress-code were arrested.

POOSH-e MA 
Since 2012, Abdoli’s main focus has been on developing her own brand called POOSH-e MA. Originally called "Poosh" (meaning "cloth" in Persian), the brand was founded in 2011.  Abdoli is the founder, senior designer and the creative director in the company.  As a side job, Abdoli is currently working as an actress too, working in a theatre since 2007. Her first collection involved a collaboration with “Street Style Fashion” which set in the Gallery of Design in Shiraz. After her brand’s debut, she started working with Mohammad Reza Vojoodi (The Chief Operating Officer of POOSH-e MA).

Abdoli and Vojoodi brought out their 2013 Spring/Summer collection, which brought the attention of news agencies such as newspapers in Iran, California and Germany, BBC World News, BBC Persian, Germany Radio and CNN. The media describes the brand as "innovative, bold and fresh whilst being respectful to women of Iran," and "colourful and modern". Abdoli has showcased further collections including POOSH-e MA Fall/Winter 2013/14, which introduced her ‘Smile Collection’. Then she launched her Spring/Summer floral collection in 2014 and lastly her Fall/Winter 2014/15 collection. For these shows she worked alongside other Iranian artists and designers including Reza Alaeddini, Hadi Qashqaei, Mohammadreza Rezania, Majid Haghighi Khoshbakht and her co-worker, Mohammad Reza Vojoodi.

POOSH-e MA’s products are made of fabrics imported from Turkey by a professional tailoring company and have stated that they maintain ideal qualities in the private factory. It is estimated that there are between 51-200 employees that are working for the company. Abdoli currently has two shops in Tehran.

Social and political backlash 
Despite the success with her brand, Abdoli is one of the many Iranian fashion designers to receive criticism from the government. This has resulted in the Iranian authorities to block certain websites and social media pages, as they wanted for women to dress plainly and not for them to be influenced by up and coming designers.

In 2013, when POOSH-e MA grew in popularity, Abdoli received a lot of skepticism from Iranian women asking if her collection was truly appropriate to wear outside. Moreover, POOSH-e Ma’s 2013 Spring/Summer collection experienced an adverse reaction from the media; the Bultan News website described Abdoli’s collection as “the Spring prostitution campaign” and had accused her fashion brand of being illicit. The claim of POOSH-e Ma being ‘too provocative’ is because her models wear leggings rather than wide leg trousers, three-quarter sleeve tops rather than long sleeved tunics and tighter fitting clothes rather than loose clothing.

In 2016, the Iranian police shut down 800 shops for selling politically challenging clothing and gave a further 3,000 shops a formal warning. POOSH-e MA received backlash following this event from Iranian MP, Zohreh Tabibzadeh. She described Abdoli’s collection (which contained the word ‘Queen’) as a “calculated plan to subvert traditional values” and also declared that Abdoli’s collection was an “ugly manifestation of a Western trend that has entered our country with evil intentions devised behind the scenes.”

In the last five years, Iran has grown drastically in terms of giving women some rights, especially in the fashion industry. Abdoli has mentioned that Iran has changed for the better, “Now you can’t count the number of people involved in fashion in Iran, with many companies holding training for modelling and designing and even offering certificates.” Iran also passed the law in December 2017, that women have the choice to partially wear the Hijab. However, not wearing a Hijab at all would result in going to Islamic education classes.

Abdoli in part of an Iranian Fashion Revolution, exploring high fashion and bringing the demand for Western fashion trends to the Middle East. Articles have spoken about Abdoli’s ambitious ways of promoting fashionable dress.

References 

Iranian fashion designers
Iranian women in business
Living people
Iranian women fashion designers
Iranian businesspeople
Year of birth missing (living people)